Events from the year 1930 in Ireland.

Incumbents
 Governor-General: James McNeill
 President of the Executive Council: W. T. Cosgrave (CnaG)

Events
 John Dulanty begins a 20-year spell as Ireland's High Commissioner (later, Ambassador) to London.
 31 December – Mayo County Council is dissolved by ministerial order for refusing to appoint Miss Letitia Dunbar-Harrison to the position of county librarian on the grounds that she is a Protestant.

Arts and literature
1 July – George Shiels' play The New Gossoon is premiered at the Abbey Theatre, Dublin.
28 August – a painting by the Dutch artist Rembrandt, found in an Irish cottage, is authenticated.
17 November – W. B. Yeats' 1-act play The Words Upon The Window Pane is premiered at the Abbey Theatre, Dublin.
 Samuel Beckett's first separately issued work, the poem Whoroscope, is published by Nancy Cunard's Hours Press in France.
 George Moore publishes Aphrodite in Aulis and A Flood.
 'Æ' (George William Russell) publishes Enchantment, and Other Poems.

Sport

Football

League of Ireland
Winners: Bohemians
FAI Cup
Winners: Shamrock Rovers 1 – 0 Brideville

Golf
Irish Open is won by Charles Whitcombe (England).

Births
4 January – Tras Honan, Fianna Fáil politician, twice Cathaoirleach of Seanad Éireann
7 January – Justin Keating, senior Irish Labour Party politician, Teachta Dála, Cabinet Minister, Member of the European Parliament and member of Seanad Éireann (died 2009)
12 January – Jennifer Johnston, novelist and playwright
18 January – Breandán Ó hEithir, journalist and broadcaster working in Irish and English languages (died 1990)
22 February – David Cremin, Bishop Emeritus of the Roman Catholic Archdiocese of Sydney
30 March – Fergus O'Brien, Fine Gael TD and Minister of State
13 March – Don Cockburn, television newsreader (died 2017)
1 April – Frank Cluskey, leader of the Irish Labour Party (died 1989)
12 April – Patrick Pery, 6th Earl of Limerick, peer and public servant (died 2003)
26 April – Jack Fitzsimons, architect, member of Seanad Éireann and campaigner (died 2014)
10 May – William McDermott, Bishop of the Roman Catholic Diocese of Huancavélica, Peru
13 June – Billy Ringrose, equestrian (died 2020)
27 June – Enda McDonagh, priest (died 2021)
28 June – William C. Campbell, parasitologist, recipient of the Nobel Prize in Physiology or Medicine
13 August – Frank Durkan, lawyer in the United States (died 2006)
19 August – Frank McCourt, teacher and writer
29 August – Mícheál Ó Muircheartaigh, Gaelic games commentator for Radio Telifís Éireann
30 August – Kieran Crotty, Fine Gael TD
9 September – Des Hanafin, Fianna Fáil politician, member of Seanad Éireann (died 2017)
26 September – Joe Sherlock, Labour Party TD (died 2007)
1 October – Richard Harris, actor (died 2002)
5 October – Sean Potts, tin whistle player with The Chieftains
11 October – Joan O'Hara, actress (died 2007)
22 October – Philomena Lynott, entrepreneur and memoirist (died 2019)
23 October – Thomas Flanagan, Auxiliary Bishop of the Diocese of San Antonio (died 2019)
4 November – Gerry Duffy, cricketer
17 November – Brian Lenihan, Fianna Fáil TD, Cabinet Minister, senator and presidential candidate (died 1995)
15 December – Edna O'Brien, novelist and short story writer
Full date unknown
Edward Delaney, sculptor
George Eogan, archaeologist, member of Seanad Éireann (died 2021)
Maeve Kelly, writer
Seán Ó Coisdealbha, poet, playwright and actor (died 2006)
Bertie Troy, priest, hurler and All-Ireland winning manager with Cork (died 2007)

Deaths
26 September – Dick Fitzgerald, Kerry Gaelic footballer (born 1882)
29 September – Bryan Mahon, British Army general, Commander-in-Chief, Ireland and Senator (born 1862)
1 October – James Whiteside McCay, Lieutenant General in the Australian Army, member of the Victorian and Australian Parliaments (born 1864)
31 October – Pierce Charles de Lacy O'Mahony, Nationalist politician, barrister and philanthropist (born 1850)
30 November – Mary Harris "Mother" Jones, labor and community organizer, member of the Industrial Workers of the World, and socialist in the United States (born 1830)

References

External links
 https://web.archive.org/web/20170524052441/http://www.irishdeathnotices.ie/

 
Years of the 20th century in Ireland
 
Ireland